Tax-free may refer to:
Duty-free shop
Tax-free shopping
Tax exemption